Werner Baake (1 November 1918 in Nordhausen, Germany – 15 July 1964) was a night fighter pilot fighter ace and recipient of the Knight's Cross of the Iron Cross who served in the Nazi German Luftwaffe during World War II. The Knight's Cross of the Iron Cross was awarded to recognize extreme battlefield bravery or successful military leadership. Baake claimed 41 nocturnal aerial victories in 195 combat missions. He was the 36th most successful night fighter ace of World War II, and of aerial warfare. Baake's total surpassed that of all Allied night fighter pilots; Branse Burbridge being the highest.

Career
Baake was born on 1 November 1918 in Nordhausen, at the time in Thuringia of the German Empire. Following flight training, Baake was posted to I. Gruppe of Nachtjagdgeschwader 1 (NJG 1), based at Gilze-Rijen, Netherlands on 21 November 1942. The unit was involved in so-called Reichsverteidigung ("Defence of the Reich") operations.

Night fighter career

Following the 1939 aerial Battle of the Heligoland Bight, bombing missions by the Royal Air Force (RAF) shifted to the cover of darkness, initiating the Defence of the Reich campaign. By mid-1940, Generalmajor (Brigadier General) Josef Kammhuber had established a night air defense system dubbed the Kammhuber Line. It consisted of a series of control sectors equipped with radars and searchlights and an associated night fighter. Each sector, named a Himmelbett (canopy bed), would direct the night fighter into visual range with target bombers. In 1941, the Luftwaffe started equipping night fighters with airborne radar such as the Lichtenstein radar. This airborne radar did not come into general use until early 1942.

It took Baake nearly seven months to make a claim, and by the time he did so, he had been promoted to Leutnant (Second Lieutenant). At the height of the Battle of the Ruhr, a concerted bomber offensive conducted by RAF Bomber Command, Baake achieved his first success. In the early hours of 2 June 1943, north of Neeroeteren, he claimed a Vickers Wellington bomber shot down at 01:10. Baake remained airborne for nearly two hours before engaging and claiming a Handley-Page Halifax shot down northwest of Gorinchem at 02:43. Baake's third victory was achieved at 00:59 hours on 17 June near "Vechel" (possibly Veghel). This time the enemy bomber was identified as an Avro Lancaster. The machine, ED629, "PH-K", was from No. 12 Squadron RAF. All of the crew – Sergeants Arthur Charles Aylard, J. Scott, T. Alexander, M. R. Williams, H. J. P. Lackey, J. W. N. Westlake and R. Swain – were killed.

On 22 June Baake claimed a Wellington southwest of Bergeyk at 01:30 and then accounted for a Halifax northeast of the town at 01:37. The successes put his total at five for which qualified him for night fighter ace.

In the early hours of 23 June, Baake claimed three victories. These included two Lancasters, at 00:55 and 1:30, near south-east Utrecht and west of Nijmegen respectively. Sergeant E. A Williams of 101 Sqn was the sole survivor from one of these Lancasters (LM325; "SR-J"). (Sgt R. A. Waterhouse, Sgt J. Osborne, Pilot Officer (P/O) T. Tomkins, Sgt E. Smith, Sgt V Sugden and Sgt R. Cooper were killed.) Baake's third victim that night was a Halifax Mk V (DK224; MP-Q) of 76 Squadron, north-west of Utrecht at 01:58. The crew bailed out and there was one fatality among them, Sgt R. Huke (flight engineer). The station commander of RAF Holme-on-Spalding Moor, Group Captain Douglas Wilson Royal Australian Air Force (RAAF), who was acting as second pilot of the Halifax, was apprehended by the Gestapo in Paris several weeks later and became a prisoner of war (POW)).

At 01:10 on 25 June 1943, Baake shot down another Wellington at Kerkdriel for his ninth victory. Baake achieved his tenth victory at 01:30 on 14 July, northwest of Utrecht. It was last during the RAF's Ruhr offensive. This aircraft was probably Halifax HR720, WP-B, of No. 158 Squadron RAF crewed by: G. R. J. Duthie Royal New Zealand Air Force (pilot, killed); J. N. Hempstead (flight engineer, evaded capture); F.D. Granger (navigator, became a POW); T. E. F. Carr (bomb-aimer, POW); G. H. King (wireless operator, POW); J. R. Grey Royal Australian Air Force (gunner, POW); and T. Pinkney (gunner, POW).

At 02:18 on 24 August, Baake claimed a Lancaster southeast of Wittenburg as Bomber Command attacked Berlin and he claimed two Short Stirling bombers on 28 August, west of Augsburg at 02:10 and northwest of Nuremberg at 02:15. One was Stirling III EE942 QS-R from No. 620 Squadron RAF flown by Flight Lieutenant John Francis Nichols. The aircraft came down at Halbersdorf, Mainz. None of the crew survived. On the night of 31 August another two Halifax bombers were claimed at 23:25 and 23:30 northeast of Lemgo and Neu-Rebstock to bring his tally to 15. In September 1943 he claimed four bombers: three Lancasters and a Halifax; one on 1 September at 0:59 near Wustermark, two on 6 September at 00:15 and scoring the last victory for the Luftwaffe that night at 02:00 over Kaiserslautern. At 22:40 north of Quakenbrück on 27 September, Baake achieved his 19th victory.

On 3 November 1943 two Lancasters were shot down near Helmond and Essen at 19:13 and 19:36. One of the Lancasters may have been Lancaster I W4822, of No. 57 Squadron RAF, captained by First Lieutenant Donald R. West, United States Army Air Forces (USAAF). West died with four other crew members; three were captured. On 18 November Bomber Command began the Berlin Campaign. On 20 December Baake shot down two Lancasters. The aircraft were reported shot down northwest of Liège, Belgium and Eindhoven, at 19:12 and 21:00 respectively—the last success being the last claim submitted by a night fighter pilot on that operation. On 16 January 1944, Baake was awarded the German Cross in Gold.

Squadron leader
On 22 January 1944, Baake was appointed Staffelkapitän (squadron leader) of 2. Staffel of NJG 1. He downed his third and last victim during the Berlin campaign on 27 January. He claimed a Lancaster shot down at 22:50 southwest of Aachen. In the engagement, Baake's Messerschmitt Bf 110 G-4 (Werknummer 740062—factory number) collided with the debris of Lancaster DS710 of the Royal Canadian Air Force (RCAF) 408 (Goose) Squadron. While Baake parachuted to safety, his radio operator Unteroffizier Heinz Waldbauer was killed. Baake claimed his 25th victory as Bomber Command attacked Aachen on the night of 11/12 April 1944. He claimed a Lancaster west of Haarlem at 23:37. Nine claims were made over Germany that night plus two claims made over England. Bomber Command lost nine.

On the night of 24/25 April Munich and Karlsruhe were targeted. Baake achieved two interceptions resulting in the destruction of a Lancaster north of Tilburg at 00:26, and a Halifax west of Gorinchem at 02:18. Baake's 28th victory was attained on 4 May at 00:20 west of Venlo. He shot down Boeing B-17 Flying Fortress M-Mother of No. 78 Squadron RAF that had been by ground fire in the target area but was intercepted and finished off by Baake. It was piloted by Flight Lieutenant J. G Smith; Smith and one crew member evaded capture but the others, including American expatriate and former USAAF officer, Sergeant W. Heubner, were captured. On 6/7 May Baake shot down another B-17 west of Venlo at 00:09, having claimed a de Havilland Mosquito at 23:25—his first and only victory against that type. The two claims made his personal total 30. Only Baake claimed a Mosquito on 6/7 May. Bomber Command records show that one belonging to No. 109 Squadron RAF was lost participating in a raid on Leverkusen.

On 12 and 23 May 1944, at 0:42 and 1:14 respectively, Baake shot down a Lancaster; to take his total to 32. The former victory was over Lancaster JB733 of No. 103 Squadron RAF, which crashed at Hallaar, northeast of Antwerp after Baake fatally damaged it over Huckhofen. Pilot Officer R. Whitley; Sergeant K. L. Ramage; Warrant Officer J. A. Carter Royal Canadian Air Force; Flight Sergeant R. B. Webb; Sergeant P. N. Crutchfield; Sergeant J. W. Smith; and Sergeant K. M. Martin were all killed. Baake claimed a Halifax on 17 June 1944 and two Lancasters on 22 June, west of Aachen for his 33rd, 34th and 35th air victories. On 27 July, Baake received the Knight's Cross of the Iron Cross.

Group commander

On 2 October 1944, Aders was appointed Gruppenkommandeur (group commander) of I. Gruppe of NJG 1, succeeding Major Paul Förster in this capacity. The RAF Bomber Command targeted Bochum on 9 October. Following the intercept mission, Baake was forced to make a belly landing in his Heinkel He 219 A-0 (Werknummer 190233) because the landing gear failed to lower, damaging the aircraft. On 4 and 6 November, Baake filed single claims for a Lancaster destroyed. On 24 December Baake claimed another Lancaster over western Germany as Bomber Command targeted rail junctions to disrupt German Army supplies during the German Ardennes Offensive. Baake's last claims came on the evening of 5 January 1945, when he downed a trio of Halifax bombers—two near Emden and another near Hannover.

Werner Baake did not claim another bomber in the last four months of the war. On the night of 18/19 March 1945, Baake narrowly avoided being killed when he was shot down in a He 219 by a Mosquito night fighter flown by night fighter ace Walter Gibb, commander of No. 239 Squadron RAF.

After the war
After the war, Baake worked as a pilot for the German airline Lufthansa. He was killed on 15 July 1964, when his Boeing 720 registration D-ABOP crashed near Ansbach during a training flight after he performed an unauthorised aerobatic manoeuvre. Following a successful barrel roll, the crew attempted a second. During this the aircraft broke apart due to structural overloading and all three members of the crew were killed.

Summary of career

Aerial victory claims
According to Spick, Baake was credited with 41 aerial victories, claimed in 195 combat missions. Obermaier also lists him with 41 nocturnal aerial victories claimed in 195 combat missions. His 41 aerial victory claims include 37 four-engined bombers and one Mosquito. Foreman, Parry and Mathews, authors of Luftwaffe Night Fighter Claims 1939 – 1945, researched the German Federal Archives and found records for 43 nocturnal victory claims. Mathews and Foreman also published Luftwaffe Aces — Biographies and Victory Claims, also listing Baake with 43 claims.

Awards
 Front Flying Clasp of the Luftwaffe
 Iron Cross (1939) 2nd and 1st Class
 Honour Goblet of the Luftwaffe (Ehrenpokal der Luftwaffe) on 6 September 1943 as Leutnant and pilot
 German Cross in Gold on 16 January 1944 as Oberleutnant in 3./Nachtjagdgeschwader 1
 Knight's Cross of the Iron Cross on 27 July 1944 as Oberleutnant and Staffelkapitän of 2./Nachtjagdgeschwader 1

See also
 List of accidents and incidents involving airliners by airline (D–O)

Notes

References

Citations

Bibliography

 
 
 
 
 
 
 
 
 
 
 
 
 
 
 
 
 
 
 
 
 
 
 
 
 
 
 
 
 
 
 
 
 
 
 
 
 
 
 
 
 
 
 

1918 births
1964 deaths
Luftwaffe pilots
German World War II flying aces
Recipients of the Gold German Cross
Recipients of the Knight's Cross of the Iron Cross
People from Nordhausen, Thuringia
People from the Province of Saxony
Aviators killed in aviation accidents or incidents in Germany
Military personnel from Thuringia
Lufthansa people